Anuj Pandit Sharma (born 21 October 1991) is an Indian film and television actor. He is better known as Bittu Sardar from Koi... Mil Gaya and as Jogi from Parvarrish - Season 2.

Biography 
Anuj is an Indian television actor. He started acting when he was 11 years old, in a movie called Koi Mil Gaya, he played the character of Bittu Sardar.

Filmography

Television

Movies

Web series

References

External links 

Indian male child actors
Indian male film actors
Living people
1991 births
Place of birth missing (living people)